Danila Vorobyev (born 16 December 2003) is a Belarusian professional footballer. In 2021, he played for Sputnik Rechitsa.

References

External links 
 

2003 births
Living people
Belarusian footballers
Association football forwards
FC Sputnik Rechitsa players